True Romance is a 1993 American romance crime film written by Quentin Tarantino and directed by Tony Scott.

True Romance may also refer to:

True Romance (Yukari Tamura album), 2003
True Romance (Golden Silvers album), 2009
True Romance (Charli XCX album), 2013
True Romance (Estelle album), 2015
"True Romance" (Motion City Soundtrack song), 2012
True Romance (Miho Nakayama song), 1996
"True Romance (True No. 9 Blues)" by Golden Silvers
"True Romance", song by Silverstein
"True Romance", a 2019 song by Ashley Tisdale from Symptoms

See also
Avon True Romance, a twelve-book series of young adult historical romance novels published by Avon Books
True Love (disambiguation)